Akkalkot Road railway station is located 11 km from Akkalkot in Solapur district in the Indian state of Maharashtra and serves Akkalkot town. Station comes under Solapur railway division of Central Railway zone. There is great demand to stop trains especially Husainsagar express, Dadar Chennai superfast express and other trains as the railway record and local newspapers reflect. There is Shani temple near the station  flocked by devotees. Swami Samarth temple flocked by devotees from entire India. The railway track in the Daund–Wadi sector is being doubled at a cost of 1000 crore. Station has computerized reservation counters, Public Call Office booth with subscriber trunk dialling facilities, waiting room, retiring room, vegetarian and non-vegetarian refreshment stalls and book stall.

Trains
Some of the trains that pass through Akkalkot Road are:

 57631/57632 Solapur–Guntakal Passenger
 57130/57131 Hyderabad–Bijapur Passenger for Hyderababd
 57650/57651 Wadi–Solapur Passenger 
 11301/11302 Udyan Express for Bangalore (overnight), Mumbai (day)  
 22157/22158 Mumbai–Chennai Mail for Mumbai (overnight) Chennai Tirupati, Mantralayam Rd
 57659/57658 Solapur–Falaknuma Passenger for Hyderabad 
 57133/57134 Raichur–Bijapur Passenger
 57628/57629 Gulbarga–Solapur Passenger
 57129/57128 Bijapur-Bolarum Passenger for Hyderabad

References

External links

 Trains at Akkalkot Road

Railway stations in Solapur district
Solapur railway division
Railway stations opened in 1860